This is a list of monuments that are classified by the Moroccan ministry of culture around Guelmim.

Monuments and sites in Guelmim 

|}

References 

Guelmim
Guelmim Province